The 2015 Internationale Jänner Rallye was the first round of the 2015 European Rally Championship season, held in Austria between 4–6 January 2015.

The rally was won by Kajetan Kajetanowicz and Jarosław Baran.

Results

Standings after the rally

References

2015 in Austrian motorsport
2015 European Rally Championship season
Jänner Rallye